Gothic Star was the name of two ships of the Blue Star Line.

Ship names